Chimère is a 1989 French drama film directed by Claire Devers. It was entered into the 1989 Cannes Film Festival.

Cast
 Béatrice Dalle - Alice
 Wadeck Stanczak - Léo
 Francis Frappat - Fred
 Julie Bataille - Mimi
 Adriana Asti - Alice's mother
 Pierre Grunstein - Alice's father
 Christophe Odent - Paul
 Toni Cecchinato - Gino
 Isabelle Candelier - The colleague
 Robert Deslandes - The hunter
 Marilyne Even - The doctor
 Isabelle Renauld - The nurse

References

External links

1989 films
1980s French-language films
1989 crime drama films
Films directed by Claire Devers
1980s French films